The 1994 Green Bay Packers season was the team's 76th season overall and their 74th in the National Football League.  The Packers finished with a 9–7 record for their third straight winning season.   1994 marked the first of 8 seasons in which Packers' quarterback Brett Favre would throw more than 30 touchdown passes. It also marked the second season in which he started all 16 games for the Packers, starting a record-breaking starting streak which would continue throughout his career. This was the final season that the Packers played at Milwaukee County Stadium; they played home games exclusively at Lambeau beginning in 1995. Three Packers had the distinction of being named to the NFL's All-Time 75th Anniversary Team: Reggie White, Don Hutson, and Ray Nitschke. After defeating the Detroit Lions 16–12 in the NFC Wild Card Game, the season ended in a 35–9 loss to the Dallas Cowboys in an NFC Divisional Playoff Game.

Offseason

1994 NFL draft

With their first selection (16th overall) in the 1994 NFL draft, the Packers tabbed offensive tackle Aaron Taylor.

Undrafted Free Agents

Staff

Roster

Regular season

The Packers finished 9–7, 2nd place in the NFC Central division, 1 game behind the 10–6 Warren Moon-led Minnesota Vikings. Via a better head-to-head record versus the Detroit Lions and the Chicago Bears and a better conference record versus the New York Giants, Green Bay clinched the first wild card spot in the NFC.

Schedule

Note: Intra-division opponents are in bold text.

Game summaries

Week 1 vs Minnesota Vikings

    
    
    
    
    
    

The Packers kicked off the season at home against their division rival, the Minnesota Vikings, and came away with a 16–10 victory to improve to 1–0.

Week 9: at Chicago Bears

Week 16 vs. Atlanta Falcons

Standings

Playoffs

Playoffs summary

NFC Wild Card Game: VS Detroit Lions

Awards and honors
Don Hutson, NFL's All-Time 75th Anniversary Team
Ray Nitschke, NFL's All-Time 75th Anniversary Team
Reggie White, NFL's All-Time 75th Anniversary Team

References

Green Bay Packers seasons
Green Bay Packers
Green